The 2021 London Spitfire season will be the fourth season of the London Spitfire's existence in the Overwatch League and the team's first under head coach Justin "reprize" Hand.

Preceding offseason

Roster changes 
The Spitfire entered the free agency with no free agents, although eight players became free agents beginning due to mutual agreements with the players and the Spitfire prior to free agency beginning.

Acquisitions 
The Spitfire's first offseason acquisition was on 26 December 2020 with the signing of Jeffrey "Blasé" Tsang, a damage player and four-year veteran of the league that competed with the Houston Outlaws in the 2020 season. The team promoted support player Riku "Ripa" Toivanen from their Overwatch Contenders academy team British Hurricane on 4 January. The next day, the Spitfire promoted three more players from British Hurricane: support player Kristian "Kellex" Keller, tank player Hadi "Hadi" Daniel Bleinagel, and tank player Mikkel "Molf1g" Djernes. The Spitfire signed two more players the following day: Dominic "Hybrid" Grove, a damage player who competed with Overwatch Contenders team Team Doge the previous season, and William "SparkR" Andersson, a damage player from British Hurricane who would not become eligible to play until June 2021 due to age restrictions. London's final offseason acquisition was on 8 February with the signing of Johannes "Shax" Nielsen, a damage player and hitscan specialist who signed with the Los Angeles Valiant in the offseason but was released after the team dropped its entire roster.

Departures 
The Spitfire released seven of its players from their contracts on 15 October, bringing validity to rumors that the team was preparing to field a roster composed entirely of Western players. The team dropped damage players Jung "Although" Hyeon-wook, Park "Babel" Sang-jun, and Lee "Schwi" Dong-jae; tank players Cho "Clestyn" Geon-hee and Kim "Jihun" Ji-hun; and support players Lee "Highly" Sung-hyuk and Jeong "Krillin" Young-hoon. Two days later, London released tank player Choi "Jmac" Dae-han, London continued its roster overhaul in November, releasing tank player Shin "Bernar" Se-won and support player Lim "SanGuiNar" Gyu-min on 17 November. Four days later, they released damage player Lim "Glister" Gil-seong. The team's final departure of the offseason was support player Kim "Fuze" Tae-hoon, who was released on 4 January 2021.

Regular season 
On 21 May, head coach Justin "reprize" Hand retired; in his replacement, the Spitfire promoted assistant coach Mads "fischer" Jehg to head coach.

Final roster

Standings

Game log

Regular season 

|2021 season schedule

References 

London Spitfire
London Spitfire
London Spitfire seasons